Meyendorff Castle or Meindorf Castle (Мeйендорф or Мeйндорф) is a Châteauesque architectural extravaganza constructed at the turn of the 20th century to Pyotr Boytsov's designs as a private residence of the Swedish-Baltic German , (a cadet line of the Baltic German noble house of Uexküll). Located between Barvikha and Odintsovo along Podushkinskoye Highway  in Odintsovsky District, Moscow Oblast west of Moscow, the castle was constructed between 1874 to 1885.

History
The Meindorf family established their estate including the castle Barvikha or the castle of Baroness Meyendorf here in 1904 prior to the Russian revolution of 1917. In 1908 under the Russian ambassador to Denmark, Baron F. M. Meyendorf became a diplomat with rank as a Russia state advisor (equivalent to a colonel) and became the first secretary of the Russian diplomatic mission to Denmark which was a very esteemed honor because Czar Nicholas II mother, the Czarina Maria Fyodorovna, was born a Danish Princess Dagmar of Denmark.

After the outbreak of the Great War the owners of the castle left Russia for abroad.

After the October Revolution the castle was occupied by Vladimir Lenin and other Bolshevik leaders. In 1935 the grounds were declared a high-profile, exclusive sanatorium. Mikhail Bulgakov, Sergey Korolyov and Yuri Gagarin were among those who vacationed at Barvikha. There is also a World War II cemetery marked by Yevgeny Vuchetich's miniature copy of his Mamayev Monument.

During Vladimir Putin's visit to the castles of the Loire valley in 2002, Jacques Chirac commented that Russia had nothing to compare with these French castles. Putin directed his staff to find a castle near Moscow and restore it. The  is officially called State Residence Barvikha since November 2008 but others (RIA Novosti and Echo Moscow) refer to it as Meyendorf Manor or Meyendorf Castle.

In the 21st century Barvikha Castle has been designated a country residence of the President of Russia. It was there that the Meyendorff Declaration of 2008 was signed by the leaders of Armenia and Azerbaijan ending the Nagorno-Karabakh conflict.

See also 
 Massandra Palace
 Millerhof

Notes

References

Books

External links 
 Official site of Meyendorff Castle
 

Châteauesque architecture
Buildings and structures in Moscow Oblast
Castles in Russia
Odintsovsky District
Official residences in the Soviet Union
Houses completed in 1885
Cultural heritage monuments of regional significance in Moscow Oblast